Alexandra Mazzucco (born 29 January 1993) is a German handball player for Thüringer HC and the German national team.

References

1993 births
Living people
German female handball players
German people of Italian descent
German people of Sicilian descent